"Mixtape" is a song recorded by Canadian country music duo Autumn Hill for their second studio album, Anchor (2015). It was released to Canadian country radio through Wax Records on January 27, 2016 as the album's third official single and to digital retailers in the United States on January 29, 2015. The song was written and produced by David "Dwave" Thomson and co-written by Stephanie Chapman and Christian Rada.

Content
"Mixtape" is a country pop song with a duration of three minutes and twenty-nine seconds with lyrics that reminisce about a former lover and relate the narrator's emotions to songs on a mixtape. The song was reportedly on hold for Keith Urban and Sheryl Crow to perform as a duet before being offered to Autumn Hill.

Critical reception
Country 103 from Kamloops, BC wrote that the song "perfectly embodies the spirit of what made Autumn Hill the banner Canadian Country duo they are today" with its "tender, playful, and... unforgettable" sound built upon strong vocal harmonies.

Track listing
Digital download – single
 "Mixtape" – 3:29

Chart performance

Release history

References

2015 songs
2016 singles
Autumn Hill songs